Tamberi is a surname. Notable people with the surname include:

Gianmarco Tamberi (born 1992), Italian high jumper
Marco Tamberi (born 1957), Italian high jumper